The 1990 Challenge Cup was the 89th staging of rugby league's oldest knockout competition, the Challenge Cup. Known as the Silk Cut Challenge Cup for sponsorship reasons, the final was contested by Wigan and Warrington at Wembley. Wigan won the match 36–14.

Preliminary round

First round

Second round

Quarter-finals

Semi finals

Final

References

External links
Challenge Cup official website 
Challenge Cup 1989/90 results at Rugby League Project

Challenge Cup
Challenge Cup